Satisfaction is a Canadian television sitcom, created by Tim McAuliffe, that debuted on CTV on June 24, 2013. Satisfaction was canceled after one season.

Premise
The show centres on couple Jason (Luke Macfarlane) and Maggie (Leah Renee) and their roommate Mark (Ryan Belleville) as they try to seek some satisfaction in their lives. The series also features their neighbour Simon (Pat Thornton), Maggie's boss, former hockey player turned bar owner Doug St. Bruce (Thomas Mitchell), neighbour and cat enthusiast Bea (Nikki Payne), and single father Gary Breakfast (Mark Critch). The concept of the show comes from creator Tim McAuliffe's experiences  as the single roommate while staying in an apartment with a couple.

Guest stars in the first season include Wendel Clark, Gordon Pinsent, Andy Kindler, Shaun Majumder, Gabrielle Miller, Jerry O'Connell, Tommy Chong, and Jessica Paré.

The series is filmed in Toronto, Ontario.

Cast
Luke Macfarlane as Jason Howell
Leah Renee as Maggie Bronson
Ryan Belleville as Mark Movenpick
Mark Critch as Gary Breakfast
Pat Thornton as Simon
Thomas Mitchell as Doug St. Bruce
Nikki Payne as Bea

Episodes

Accolades
At the 2nd Canadian Screen Awards, Jason Priestley was nominated for Best Direction in a Comedy Program or Series. Mary Kirkland, Rupert Lazarus and Sean Breaugh were nominated for Best Production Design or Art Direction in a Fiction Program or Series.

References

External links
 
 

2010s Canadian sitcoms
2013 Canadian television series debuts
2013 Canadian television series endings
CTV Television Network original programming
Television shows filmed in Toronto
Television series by Lionsgate Television
Television series by DHX Media
Television series by Bell Media